Glaphyria spinacrista is a moth in the family Crambidae. It was described by Maria Alma Solis and David Adamski in 1998. It is found in north-western Costa Rica.

References

Moths described in 1998
Glaphyriini